Angelicque E. White is an American oceanographer. She is an associate professor at the University of Hawaiʻi at Mānoa School of Ocean and Earth Science and Technology and director of the Hawaii Ocean Time-series (HOT) program.

Early life and education
White earned her Bachelor of Science and Master of Science degree from the University of Alabama in Huntsville before enrolling at Oregon State University for her PhD in Biological Oceanography. She conducted her postdoctoral research with David Karl on the Hawaii Ocean Time-series (HOT) program.

Career
Upon completing her PhD, White became an assistant professor at Oregon State University. Her research focus remained on "understanding how specific organisms acquire the elements necessary for growth and how different nutrient sources impact primary productivity and particle export." During her tenure at Oregon State, she participated in various expeditions, including to the Great Pacific garbage patch, and received a 2012 Sloan Research Fellowship. White also took pictures while studying marine phytoplankton which were then displayed at the Corvallis Arts Center in an exhibition titled The Art of Plankton: Form Follows Function. In 2015, she received the Yentsch‐Schindler Early Career Award in recognition of her contributions to research, science training, and broader societal issues. She was also promoted to the role of associate professor from 2015 until 2018 when she left to join the faculty at the University of Hawaiʻi at Mānoa.

Upon joining the faculty at the University of Hawai‘i at Mānoa School of Ocean and Earth Science and Technology, White replaced Karl as leader of the HOT program. She also received funding from the National Science Foundation to continue the program for five more years.

In 2020, White's 2019 TED talk about ocean microbes and the changing climate made the list of the most watched TED talks

Research 

White's Ph.D. research examined the factors controlling the bloom forming marine phytoplankton Trichodesmium. White's past research includes harmful algal blooms and microplastics.

Personal life
White was engaged in a long-term partnership with Jennifer DeVries from 2002 until her death in 2012.

Selected publications

Honors and awards 

 ASLO Yentsch-Schindler Early Career Award (2016)
 AGU Early Career Award (2016)
 Oregon State University Inspirational Woman Award (2015)
 Alfred P. Sloan Research Fellowship (2012)
 National Academy of Science Kavli Fellow (2010)

References

External links
 

Living people
University of Hawaiʻi faculty
Oregon State University alumni
University of Alabama in Huntsville alumni
American oceanographers
American LGBT scientists
Year of birth missing (living people)
Women oceanographers
21st-century American scientists
21st-century American women scientists
American women academics
21st-century American LGBT people